Marie-Chantal, Crown Princess of Greece, Princess of Denmark (born Marie-Chantal Claire Miller, 17 September 1968), is the wife of Pavlos, Crown Prince of Greece, son of Constantine II of Greece (1940–2023) and Anne-Marie of Denmark. Marie-Chantal's husband was the heir apparent to the now defunct throne of Greece, as the monarchy was abolished in 1973.

Early life
Marie-Chantal Miller was born in London, England, to Robert Warren Miller, an American-born British businessman, and his wife María Clara "Chantal" Pesantes Becerra, an Ecuadorian. She has an older sister, Pia, ex-wife of Christopher Getty, and a younger sister, Alexandra, ex-wife of Prince Alexander von Fürstenberg. She was baptized in the Catholic faith at St. Patrick's Cathedral in New York City by the Archbishop of New York, John Cardinal O'Connor, with Princess Donatella Missikoff Flick serving as her godmother.

Marie-Chantal was raised in Hong Kong where she attended The Peak School until she was 9 years old when she went to board at Institut Le Rosey in Switzerland. In 1982 she transferred to the Ecole Active Bilingue in Paris until her senior year which she took at The Masters School in New York. After graduating she attended the Academy of Arts for one year. She began a degree in History of Art at New York University in 1993 but dropped out a year later after Pavlos, Crown Prince of Greece, proposed to her on a skiing holiday in Gstaad, Switzerland, at Christmas.

Marriage

In 1994, Marie-Chantal became engaged to Pavlos, Crown Prince of Greece, son of the deposed King Constantine II and Queen Anne Marie. She converted from Roman Catholicism to Greek Orthodoxy taking the greek name María on 22 May 1995 in a private Chrismation (confirmation) ceremony held at St Paul's Chapel in New York. Her engagement ring was a cabochon-cut sapphire and heart-shaped diamond ring. The wedding was planned by Lady Elizabeth Anson and Robert Isabell. Marie-Chantal wore a Valentino dress. The ceremony was held on 1 July 1995 at St Sophia's Cathedral in London. Attendees included many members of European royal families.

The couple have five children: 
Princess Maria-Olympia (born 25 July 1996 at Weill Cornell Medical Center in New York City), 
Prince Constantine-Alexios (born 29 October 1998 at Weill Cornell Medical Center in New York City), 
Prince Achileas-Andreas (born 12 August 2000 at Weill Cornell Medical Center in New York City), 
Prince Odysseus-Kimon (born 17 September 2004 at Portland Hospital in London),
Prince Aristides-Stavros (born 29 June 2008 at Cedars-Sinai Medical Center in Los Angeles).

Career
In 2000, Marie-Chantal founded the luxury childrenswear brand Marie-Chantal. In 2019, she published the book Manners Begin at Breakfast: Modern etiquette for families. She is a trustee of the Royal Academy Trust and a board director of DFS Group Ltd.

Notable published works 
 Manners Begin at Breakfast: Modern etiquette for families (2019).

Honours
  Greek Royal Family:
  10 January 2023 – present: Grand Mistress and Dame Grand Cross of the Royal Order of Saints Olga and Sophia 
 1 July 1995 – 10 January 2023: Dame Grand Cross of the Royal Order of Saints Olga and Sophia
  Commemorative Badge of the 50th Birthday Medal of King Carl XVI Gustaf (30 April 1996)

References

External links

1968 births
Living people
Alumni of Institut Le Rosey
Converts to Eastern Orthodoxy from Roman Catholicism
Greek princesses
Danish princesses
Danish people of American descent
Danish people of English descent
Princesses by marriage
House of Glücksburg (Greece)
Artists from London
English socialites
English people of Ecuadorian descent
English people of American descent
English people of Greek descent
English people of Danish descent
English Eastern Orthodox Christians
British expatriates in Hong Kong
English expatriates in the United States
New York University alumni
British designers
Miller family
Children's clothing designers
Greek expatriates in Switzerland
The Masters School people